The Hundred Years' War (1337–1453) was a series of armed conflicts between the kingdoms of England and France during the Late Middle Ages. It originated from disputed claims to the French throne between the English House of Plantagenet and the French royal House of Valois. Over time, the war grew into a broader power struggle involving factions from across Western Europe, fuelled by emerging nationalism on both sides. 

The Hundred Years' War was one of the most significant conflicts of the Middle Ages. For 116 years, interrupted by several truces, five generations of kings from two rival dynasties fought for the throne of the dominant kingdom in Western Europe. The war's effect on European history was lasting. Both sides produced innovations in military technology and tactics, including professional standing armies and artillery, that permanently changed warfare in Europe; chivalry, which had reached its height during the conflict, subsequently declined. Stronger national identities took root in both countries, which became more centralised and gradually rose as global powers.

The term "Hundred Years' War" was adopted by later historians as a historiographical periodisation to encompass related conflicts, constructing the longest military conflict in European history. The war is commonly divided into three phases separated by truces: the Edwardian War (1337–1360), the Caroline War (1369–1389), and the Lancastrian War (1415–1453). Each side drew many allies into the conflict, with English forces initially prevailing; however, the French forces under House of Valois ultimately retained control over the Kingdom of France, and the French and English monarchies, previously intertwined, thereafter remaining separate.

Overview

Origins 
The root causes of the conflict can be traced to the crisis of 14th-century Europe. The outbreak of war was motivated by a gradual rise in tension between the kings of France and England over territory; the official pretext was the question that arose because of the interruption of the direct male line of the Capetian dynasty.

Tensions between the French and English crowns had gone back centuries to the origins of the English royal family, which was French (Norman, and later, Angevin) in origin because of William the Conqueror, the Norman duke who became King of England in 1066. English monarchs had therefore historically held titles and lands within France, which made them vassals to the kings of France. The status of the English king's French fiefs was a major source of conflict between the two monarchies throughout the Middle Ages. French monarchs systematically sought to check the growth of English power, stripping away lands as the opportunity arose, particularly whenever England was at war with Scotland, an ally of France. English holdings in France had varied in size, at some points dwarfing even the French royal domain; by 1337, however, only Gascony was English.

In 1328, Charles IV of France died without any sons or brothers, and a new principle, Salic law, disallowed female succession. Charles's closest male relative was his nephew Edward III of England, whose mother, Isabella, was Charles's sister. Isabella claimed the throne of France for her son by the rule of proximity of blood, but the French nobility rejected this, maintaining that Isabella could not transmit a right she did not possess. An assembly of French barons decided that a native Frenchman should receive the crown, rather than Edward.

So the throne passed instead to Charles's patrilineal cousin, Philip, Count of Valois. Edward protested but ultimately submitted and did homage for Gascony. Further French disagreements with Edward induced Philip, during May 1337, to meet with his Great Council in Paris. It was agreed that Gascony should be taken back into Philip's hands, which prompted Edward to renew his claim for the French throne, this time by force of arms.

Edwardian Phase 
In the early years of the war, the English, led by their king and his son Edward, the Black Prince, saw resounding successes (notably at Crécy in 1346 and at Poitiers in 1356 where King John II of France was taken prisoner).

Caroline Phase and Black Death 
By 1378, under King Charles V the Wise and the leadership of Bertrand du Guesclin, the French had reconquered most of the lands ceded to King Edward in the Treaty of Brétigny (signed in 1360), leaving the English with only a few cities on the continent.

In the following decades, the weakening of royal authority, combined with the devastation caused by the Black Death of 1347–1351 (with the loss of nearly half of the French population and between 20% and 33% of the English one) and the major economic crisis that followed, led to a period of civil unrest in both countries. These crises were resolved in England earlier than in France.

Lancastrian Phase and after 
The newly crowned Henry V of England seized the opportunity presented by the mental illness of Charles VI of France and the French civil war between Armagnacs and Burgundians to revive the conflict. Overwhelming victories at Agincourt in 1415 and Verneuil in 1424 as well as an alliance with the Burgundians raised the prospects of an ultimate English triumph and persuaded the English to continue the war over many decades. However, a variety of factors such as the deaths of both Henry and Charles in 1422, the emergence of Joan of Arc which boosted French morale, and the loss of Burgundy as an ally—marking the end of the civil war in France—prevented it.

The Siege of Orléans in 1429 announced the beginning of the end for English hopes of conquest. Even with the eventual capture of Joan by the Burgundians and her execution in 1431, a series of crushing French victories such as those at Patay in 1429, Formigny in 1450 and Castillon in 1453 concluded the war in favour of the Valois dynasty. England permanently lost most of its continental possessions, with only the Pale of Calais remaining under its control on the continent, until it too was lost in the Siege of Calais in 1558.

Related conflicts and aftereffects 
Local conflicts in neighbouring areas, which were contemporarily related to the war, including the War of the Breton Succession (1341–1364), the Castilian Civil War (1366–1369), the War of the Two Peters (1356–1369) in Aragon, and the 1383–85 crisis in Portugal, were used by the parties to advance their agendas.

By the War's end, feudal armies had been largely replaced by professional troops, and aristocratic dominance had yielded to a democratisation of the manpower and weapons of armies. Although primarily a dynastic conflict, the war inspired French and English nationalism. The wider introduction of weapons and tactics supplanted the feudal armies where heavy cavalry had dominated, and artillery became important. The war precipitated the creation of the first standing armies in Western Europe since the Western Roman Empire, and helped change their role in warfare.

In France, civil wars, deadly epidemics, famines, and bandit free-companies of mercenaries reduced the population drastically. In England, political forces over time came to oppose the costly venture. The dissatisfaction of English nobles, resulting from the loss of their continental landholdings, as well as the general shock at losing a war in which investment had been so great, helped lead to the Wars of the Roses (1455–1487).

Causes and prelude

Dynastic turmoil in France: 1316–1328 

The question of female succession to the French throne was raised after the death of Louis X in 1316. Louis left behind a young daughter, Joan II of Navarre, and a son, John I of France, although he only lived for five days. However, Joan's paternity was in question, as her mother, Margaret of Burgundy, was accused of being an adulterer in the Tour de Nesle affair. Given the situation, Philip, Count of Poitiers and brother of Louis X, positioned himself to take the crown, advancing the stance that women should be ineligible to succeed to the French throne. Through his political sagacity he won over his adversaries and succeeded to the French throne as Philip V. When he died in 1322, leaving only daughters behind, the crown then passed to his younger brother, Charles IV. 

Charles IV died in 1328, leaving behind his young daughter and pregnant wife, Joan of Évreux. He decreed that, if the unborn child was male, he would become king. If not, Charles left the choice of his successor to the nobles. Joan gave birth to a girl, Blanche of France (later Duchess of Orleans). With the death of Charles IV and birth of Blanche, the main male line of the House of Capet was rendered extinct.

By proximity of blood, the nearest male relative of Charles IV was his nephew, Edward III of England. Edward was the son of Isabella, the sister of the dead Charles IV, but the question arose whether she should be able to transmit a right to inherit that she did not herself possess. Moreover, the French nobility baulked at the prospect of being ruled by an Englishman; especially one whose mother, Isabella, and her lover, Roger Mortimer, were widely suspected of having murdered the previous English king, Edward II. The assemblies of the French barons, prelates, and the University of Paris decided that males who derive their right to inheritance through their mother should be excluded from consideration. Therefore, excluding Edward, the nearest heir through the male line was Charles IV's first cousin, Philip, Count of Valois, and it was decided that he should take the throne. He was crowned Philip VI in 1328. In 1340 the Avignon papacy confirmed that, under Salic law, males would not be able to inherit through their mothers.

Eventually, Edward III reluctantly recognized Philip VI and paid him homage for the duchy of Aquitaine and Gascony in 1329. He made concessions in Guyenne, but reserved the right to reclaim territories arbitrarily confiscated. After that, he expected to be left undisturbed while he made war on Scotland.

The dispute over Guyenne: a problem of sovereignty 

Tensions between the French and English monarchies can be traced back to the 1066 Norman Conquest of England, in which the English throne was seized by the Duke of Normandy, a vassal of the King of France. As a result, the crown of England was held by a succession of nobles who already owned lands in France, which put them among the most powerful subjects of the French King, as they could now draw upon the economic power of England to enforce their interests in the mainland. To the kings of France, this dangerously threatened their royal authority, and so they would constantly try to undermine English rule in France, while the English monarchs would struggle to protect and expand their lands. This clash of interests was the root cause of much of the conflict between the French and English monarchies throughout the medieval era.

The Anglo-Norman dynasty that had ruled England since the Norman conquest of 1066 was brought to an end when Henry, the son of Geoffrey of Anjou and Empress Matilda, and great-grandson of William the Conqueror, became the first of the Angevin kings of England in 1154 as Henry II. The Angevin kings ruled over what was later known as the Angevin Empire, which included more French territory than that under the kings of France. The Angevins still owed homage for these territories to the French king. From the 11th century, the Angevins had autonomy within their French domains, neutralising the issue.

King John of England inherited the Angevin domains from his brother Richard I. However, Philip II of France acted decisively to exploit the weaknesses of John, both legally and militarily, and by 1204 had succeeded in taking control of much of the Angevin continental possessions. Following John's reign, the Battle of Bouvines (1214), the Saintonge War (1242), and finally the War of Saint-Sardos (1324), the English king's holdings on the continent, as Duke of Aquitaine, were limited roughly to provinces in Gascony.

The dispute over Guyenne is even more important than the dynastic question in explaining the outbreak of the war. Guyenne posed a significant problem to the kings of France and England: Edward III was a vassal of Philip VI of France because of his French possessions and was required to recognise the suzerainty of the King of France over them. In practical terms, a judgment in Guyenne might be subject to an appeal to the French royal court. The King of France had the power to revoke all legal decisions made by the King of England in Aquitaine, which was unacceptable to the English. Therefore, sovereignty over Guyenne was a latent conflict between the two monarchies for several generations.

During the War of Saint-Sardos, Charles of Valois, father of Philip VI, invaded Aquitaine on behalf of Charles IV and conquered the duchy after a local insurrection, which the French believed had been incited by Edward II of England. Charles IV grudgingly agreed to return this territory in 1325. To recover his duchy, Edward II had to compromise: he sent his son, the future Edward III, to pay homage.

The King of France agreed to restore Guyenne, minus Agen but the French delayed the return of the lands, which helped Philip VI. On 6 June 1329, Edward III finally paid homage to the King of France. However, at the ceremony, Philip VI had it recorded that the homage was not due to the fiefs detached from the duchy of Guyenne by Charles IV (especially Agen). For Edward, the homage did not imply the renunciation of his claim to the extorted lands.

Gascony under the King of England 

In the 11th century, Gascony in southwest France had been incorporated into Aquitaine (also known as Guyenne or Guienne) and formed with it the province of Guyenne and Gascony (French: Guyenne-et-Gascogne). The Angevin kings of England became Dukes of Aquitaine after Henry II married the former Queen of France, Eleanor of Aquitaine, in 1152, from which point the lands were held in vassalage to the French Crown. By the 13th century the terms Aquitaine, Guyenne and Gascony were virtually synonymous.

At the beginning of Edward III's reign on 1 February 1327, the only part of Aquitaine that remained in his hands was the Duchy of Gascony. The term Gascony came to be used for the territory held by the Angevin (Plantagenet) Kings of England in southwest France, although they still used the title Duke of Aquitaine.

For the first 10 years of Edward III's reign, Gascony had been a major point of friction. The English argued that, as Charles IV had not acted in a proper way towards his tenant, Edward should be able to hold the duchy free of any French suzerainty. This argument was rejected by the French, so in 1329, the 17-year-old Edward III paid homage to Philip VI. Tradition demanded that vassals approach their liege unarmed, with heads bare. Edward protested by attending the ceremony wearing his crown and sword. Even after this pledge of homage, the French continued to pressure the English administration.

Gascony was not the only sore point. One of Edward's influential advisers was Robert III of Artois. Robert was an exile from the French court, having fallen out with Philip VI over an inheritance claim. He urged Edward to start a war to reclaim France, and was able to provide extensive intelligence on the French court.

Franco-Scot alliance 

France was an ally of the Kingdom of Scotland as English kings had for some time tried to subjugate the country. In 1295, a treaty was signed between France and Scotland during the reign of Philip the Fair known as the Auld Alliance. Charles IV formally renewed the treaty in 1326, promising Scotland that France would support the Scots if England invaded their country. Similarly, France would have Scotland's support if its own kingdom were attacked. Edward could not succeed in his plans for Scotland if the Scots could count on French support.

Philip VI had assembled a large naval fleet off Marseilles as part of an ambitious plan for a crusade to the Holy Land. However, the plan was abandoned and the fleet, including elements of the Scottish navy, moved to the English Channel off Normandy in 1336, threatening England. To deal with this crisis, Edward proposed that the English raise two armies, one to deal with the Scots "at a suitable time", the other to proceed at once to Gascony. At the same time, ambassadors were to be sent to France with a proposed treaty for the French king.

Beginning of the war: 1337–1360

End of homage 
At the end of April 1337, Philip of France was invited to meet the delegation from England but refused. The arrière-ban, literally a call to arms, was proclaimed throughout France starting on 30 April 1337. Then, in May 1337, Philip met with his Great Council in Paris. It was agreed that the Duchy of Aquitaine, effectively Gascony, should be taken back into the king's hands on the grounds that Edward III was in breach of his obligations as vassal and had sheltered the king's 'mortal enemy' Robert d'Artois. Edward responded to the confiscation of Aquitaine by challenging Philip's right to the French throne. 

When Charles IV died, Edward had made a claim for the succession of the French throne, through the right of his mother Isabella (Charles IV's sister), daughter of Philip IV. Any claim was considered invalidated by Edward's homage to Philip VI in 1329. Edward revived his claim and in 1340 formally assumed the title 'King of France and the French Royal Arms'.

On 26 January 1340, Edward III formally received homage from Guy, half-brother of the Count of Flanders. The civic authorities of Ghent, Ypres and Bruges proclaimed Edward King of France. Edward's purpose was to strengthen his alliances with the Low Countries. His supporters would be able to claim that they were loyal to the "true" King of France and were not rebels against Philip. In February 1340, Edward returned to England to try to raise more funds and also deal with political difficulties.

Relations with Flanders were also tied to the English wool trade, since Flanders' principal cities relied heavily on textile production and England supplied much of the raw material they needed. Edward III had commanded that his chancellor sit on the woolsack in council as a symbol of the pre-eminence of the wool trade. At the time there were about 110,000 sheep in Sussex alone. The great medieval English monasteries produced large surpluses of wool that were sold to mainland Europe. Successive governments were able to make large amounts of money by taxing it. France's sea power led to economic disruptions for England, shrinking the wool trade to Flanders and the wine trade from Gascony.

Outbreak, the English Channel and Brittany 

On 22 June 1340, Edward and his fleet sailed from England and the next day arrived off the Zwin estuary. The French fleet assumed a defensive formation off the port of Sluis. The English fleet deceived the French into believing they were withdrawing. When the wind turned in the late afternoon, the English attacked with the wind and sun behind them. The French fleet was almost completely destroyed in what became known as the Battle of Sluys.

England dominated the English Channel for the rest of the war, preventing French invasions. At this point, Edward's funds ran out and the war probably would have ended were it not for the death of the Duke of Brittany in 1341 precipitating a succession dispute between the duke's half-brother John of Montfort and Charles of Blois, nephew of Philip VI.

In 1341, conflict over the succession to the Duchy of Brittany began the War of the Breton Succession, in which Edward backed John of Montfort and Philip backed Charles of Blois. Action for the next few years focused around a back-and-forth struggle in Brittany. The city of Vannes in Brittany changed hands several times, while further campaigns in Gascony met with mixed success for both sides. The English-backed Montfort finally succeeded in taking the duchy but not until 1364.

Battle of Crécy and the taking of Calais 

In July 1346, Edward mounted a major invasion across the channel, landing in Normandy's Cotentin, at St. Vaast. The English army captured the city of Caen in just one day, surprising the French. Philip mustered a large army to oppose Edward, who chose to march northward toward the Low Countries, pillaging as he went. He reached the river Seine to find most of the crossings destroyed. He moved further and further south, worryingly close to Paris, until he found the crossing at Poissy. This had only been partially destroyed, so the carpenters within his army were able to fix it. He then continued on his way to Flanders until he reached the river Somme. The army crossed at a tidal ford at Blanchetaque, leaving Philip's army stranded. Edward, assisted by this head start, continued on his way to Flanders once more, until, finding himself unable to outmanoeuvre Philip, Edward positioned his forces for battle and Philip's army attacked.

The Battle of Crécy of 1346 was a complete disaster for the French, largely credited to the longbowmen and the French king, who allowed his army to attack before it was ready. Philip appealed to his Scottish allies to help with a diversionary attack on England. King David II of Scotland responded by invading northern England, but his army was defeated and he was captured at the Battle of Neville's Cross, on 17 October 1346. This greatly reduced the threat from Scotland.

In France, Edward proceeded north unopposed and besieged the city of Calais on the English Channel, capturing it in 1347. This became an important strategic asset for the English, allowing them to keep troops safely in northern France. Calais would remain under English control, even after the end of the Hundred Years' War, until the successful French siege in 1558.

Battle of Poitiers 

The Black Death, which had just arrived in Paris in 1348, began to ravage Europe. In 1355, after the plague had passed and England was able to recover financially, King Edward's son and namesake, the Prince of Wales, later known as the Black Prince, led a Chevauchée from Gascony into France, during which he pillaged Avignonet and Castelnaudary, sacked Carcassonne, and plundered Narbonne. The next year during another Chevauchée he ravaged Auvergne, Limousin, and Berry but failed to take Bourges. He offered terms of peace to King John II of France (known as John the Good), who had outflanked him near Poitiers, but refused to surrender himself as the price of their acceptance.

This led to the Battle of Poitiers (19 September 1356) where the Black Prince's army routed the French. During the battle, the Gascon noble Jean de Grailly, captal de Buch led a mounted unit that was concealed in a forest. The French advance was contained, at which point de Grailly led a flanking movement with his horsemen cutting off the French retreat and succeeding in capturing King John and many of his nobles. With John held hostage, his son the Dauphin (later to become Charles V) assumed the powers of the king as regent.

After the Battle of Poitiers, many French nobles and mercenaries rampaged, and chaos ruled. A contemporary report recounted:

Reims Campaign and Black Monday 

Edward invaded France, for the third and last time, hoping to capitalise on the discontent and seize the throne. The Dauphin's strategy was that of non-engagement with the English army in the field. However, Edward wanted the crown and chose the cathedral city of Reims for his coronation (Reims was the traditional coronation city). However, the citizens of Reims built and reinforced the city's defences before Edward and his army arrived. Edward besieged the city for five weeks, but the defences held and there was no coronation. Edward moved on to Paris, but retreated after a few skirmishes in the suburbs. Next was the town of Chartres.

Disaster struck in a freak hailstorm on the encamped army, causing over 1,000 English deaths – the so-called Black Monday at Easter 1360. This devastated Edward's army and forced him to negotiate when approached by the French. A conference was held at Brétigny that resulted in the Treaty of Brétigny (8 May 1360). The treaty was ratified at Calais in October. In return for increased lands in Aquitaine, Edward renounced Normandy, Touraine, Anjou and Maine and consented to reduce King John's ransom by a million crowns. Edward also abandoned his claim to the crown of France.

First peace: 1360–1369 

The French king, John II, had been held captive in England. The Treaty of Brétigny set his ransom at 3 million crowns and allowed for hostages to be held in lieu of John. The hostages included two of his sons, several princes and nobles, four inhabitants of Paris, and two citizens from each of the nineteen principal towns of France. While these hostages were held, John returned to France to try and raise funds to pay the ransom. In 1362 John's son Louis of Anjou, a hostage in English-held Calais, escaped captivity. So, with his stand-in hostage gone, John felt honour-bound to return to captivity in England.

The French crown had been at odds with Navarre (near southern Gascony) since 1354, and in 1363 the Navarrese used the captivity of John II in London and the political weakness of the Dauphin to try to seize power. Although there was no formal treaty, Edward III supported the Navarrese moves, particularly as there was a prospect that he might gain control over the northern and western provinces as a consequence. With this in mind, Edward deliberately slowed the peace negotiations. In 1364, John II died in London, while still in honourable captivity. Charles V succeeded him as king of France. On 16 May, one month after the dauphin's accession and three days before his coronation as Charles V, the Navarrese suffered a crushing defeat at the Battle of Cocherel.

French ascendancy under Charles V: 1369–1389

Aquitaine and Castile 

In 1366 there was a civil war of succession in Castile (part of modern Spain). The forces of the ruler Peter of Castile were pitched against those of his half-brother Henry of Trastámara. The English crown supported Peter; the French supported Henry. French forces were led by Bertrand du Guesclin, a Breton, who rose from relatively humble beginnings to prominence as one of France's war leaders. Charles V provided a force of 12,000, with du Guesclin at their head, to support Trastámara in his invasion of Castile.

Peter appealed to England and Aquitaine's Black Prince for help, but none was forthcoming, forcing Peter into exile in Aquitaine. The Black Prince had previously agreed to support Peter's claims but concerns over the terms of the treaty of Brétigny led him to assist Peter as a representative of Aquitaine, rather than England. He then led an Anglo-Gascon army into Castile. Peter was restored to power after Trastámara's army was defeated at the Battle of Nájera.

Although the Castilians had agreed to fund the Black Prince, they failed to do so. The Prince was suffering from ill health and returned with his army to Aquitaine. To pay off debts incurred during the Castile campaign, the prince instituted a hearth tax. Arnaud-Amanieu VIII, Lord of Albret had fought on the Black Prince's side during the war. Albret, who already had become discontented by the influx of English administrators into the enlarged Aquitaine, refused to allow the tax to be collected in his fief. He then joined a group of Gascon lords who appealed to Charles V for support in their refusal to pay the tax. Charles V summoned one Gascon lord and the Black Prince to hear the case in his High Court in Paris. The Black Prince answered that he would go to Paris with sixty thousand men behind him. War broke out again and Edward III resumed the title of King of France. Charles V declared that all the English possessions in France were forfeited, and before the end of 1369 all of Aquitaine was in full revolt.

With the Black Prince gone from Castile, Henry of Trastámara led a second invasion that ended with Peter's death at the Battle of Montiel in March 1369. The new Castilian regime provided naval support to French campaigns against Aquitaine and England. In 1372 the Castilian fleet defeated the English fleet in the Battle of La Rochelle.

1373 campaign of John of Gaunt 

While initially successful as French forces were insufficiently concentrated to oppose them, the English met more resistance as they moved south. French forces began to concentrate around the English force but under orders from Charles V, the French avoided a set battle. Instead, they fell on forces detached from the main body to raid or forage. The French shadowed the English and in October, the English found themselves trapped against the River Allier by four French forces. With some difficulty, the English crossed at the bridge at Moulins but lost all their baggage and loot. The English carried on south across the Limousin plateau but the weather was turning severe. Men and horses died in great numbers and many soldiers, forced to march on foot, discarded their armour. At the beginning of December, the English army entered friendly territory in Gascony. By the end of December they were in Bordeaux, starving, ill-equipped and having lost over half of the 30,000 horses with which they had left Calais. Although the march across France had been a remarkable feat, it was a military failure.

English turmoil 

With his health deteriorating, the Black Prince returned to England in January 1371, where his father Edward III was elderly and also in poor health. The prince's illness was debilitating, and he died on 8 June 1376. Edward III died the following year on 21 June 1377 and was succeeded by the Black Prince's second son Richard II who was still a child of 10 (Edward of Angoulême, the Black Prince's first son, had died sometime earlier). The treaty of Brétigny had left Edward III and England with enlarged holdings in France, but a small professional French army under the leadership of du Guesclin pushed the English back; by the time Charles V died in 1380, the English held only Calais and a few other ports.

It was usual to appoint a regent in the case of a child monarch but no regent was appointed for Richard II, who nominally exercised the power of kingship from the date of his accession in 1377. Between 1377 and 1380, actual power was in the hands of a series of councils. The political community preferred this to a regency led by the king's uncle, John of Gaunt, although Gaunt remained highly influential. Richard faced many challenges during his reign, including the Peasants' Revolt led by Wat Tyler in 1381 and an Anglo-Scottish war in 1384–1385. His attempts to raise taxes to pay for his Scottish adventure and for the protection of Calais against the French made him increasingly unpopular.

1380 campaign of the Earl of Buckingham 
In July 1380, the Earl of Buckingham commanded an expedition to France to aid England's ally, the Duke of Brittany. The French refused battle before the walls of Troyes on 25 August; Buckingham's forces continued their  and in November laid siege to Nantes. The support expected from the Duke of Brittany did not appear and in the face of severe losses in men and horses, Buckingham was forced to abandon the siege in January 1381. In February, reconciled to the regime of the new French king Charles VI by the Treaty of Guérande, Brittany paid 50,000 francs to Buckingham for him to abandon the siege and the campaign.

French turmoil 
After the deaths of Charles V and du Guesclin in 1380, France lost its main leadership and overall momentum in the war. Charles VI succeeded his father as king of France at the age of 11, and he was thus put under a regency led by his uncles, who managed to maintain an effective grip on government affairs until about 1388, well after Charles had achieved royal majority.

With France facing widespread destruction, plague, and economic recession, high taxation put a heavy burden on the French peasantry and urban communities. The war effort against England largely depended on royal taxation, but the population was increasingly unwilling to pay for it, as would be demonstrated at the Harelle and Maillotin revolts in 1382. Charles V had abolished many of these taxes on his deathbed, but subsequent attempts to reinstate them stirred up hostility between the French government and populace.

Philip II of Burgundy, the uncle of the French king, brought together a Burgundian-French army and a fleet of 1,200 ships near the Zeeland town of Sluis in the summer and autumn of 1386 to attempt an invasion of England, but this venture failed. However, Philip's brother John of Berry appeared deliberately late, so that the autumn weather prevented the fleet from leaving and the invading army then dispersed again.

Difficulties in raising taxes and revenue hampered the ability of the French to fight the English. At this point, the war's pace had largely slowed down, and both nations found themselves fighting mainly through proxy wars, such as during the 1383–1385 Portuguese interregnum. The independence party in the Kingdom of Portugal, which was supported by the English, won against the supporters of the King of Castile's claim to the Portuguese throne, who in turn was backed by the French.

Second peace: 1389–1415 

The war became increasingly unpopular with the English public due to the high taxes needed for the war effort. These taxes were seen as one of the reasons for the Peasants' Revolt. Richard II's indifference to the war together with his preferential treatment of a select few close friends and advisors angered an alliance of lords that included one of his uncles. This group, known as Lords Appellant, managed to press charges of treason against five of Richard's advisors and friends in the Merciless Parliament. The Lords Appellant were able to gain control of the council in 1388 but failed to reignite the war in France. Although the will was there, the funds to pay the troops was lacking, so in the autumn of 1388 the Council agreed to resume negotiations with the French crown, beginning on 18 June 1389 with the signing of the three-year Truce of Leulinghem.

In 1389, Richard's uncle and supporter, John of Gaunt, returned from Spain and Richard was able to rebuild his power gradually until 1397, when he reasserted his authority and destroyed the principal three among the Lords Appellant. In 1399, after John of Gaunt died, Richard II disinherited Gaunt's son, the exiled Henry of Bolingbroke. Bolingbroke returned to England with his supporters, deposed Richard and had himself crowned Henry IV. In Scotland, the problems brought in by the English regime change prompted border raids that were countered by an invasion in 1402 and the defeat of a Scottish army at the Battle of Homildon Hill. A dispute over the spoils between Henry and Henry Percy, 1st Earl of Northumberland, resulted in a long and bloody struggle between the two for control of northern England, resolved only with the almost complete destruction of the House of Percy by 1408.

In Wales, Owain Glyndŵr was declared Prince of Wales on 16 September 1400. He was the leader of the most serious and widespread rebellion against England authority in Wales since the conquest of 1282–1283. In 1405, the French allied with Glyndŵr and the Castilians in Spain; a Franco-Welsh army advanced as far as Worcester, while the Spaniards used galleys to raid and burn all the way from Cornwall to Southampton, before taking refuge in Harfleur for the winter. The Glyndŵr Rising was finally put down in 1415 and resulted in Welsh semi-independence for a number of years.

In 1392, Charles VI suddenly descended into madness, forcing France into a regency dominated by his uncles and his brother. A conflict for control over the Regency began between his uncle Philip the Bold, Duke of Burgundy and his brother, Louis of Valois, Duke of Orléans. After Philip's death, his son and heir John the Fearless continued the struggle against Louis but with the disadvantage of having no close relation to the king. Finding himself outmanoeuvred politically, John ordered the assassination of Louis in retaliation. His involvement in the murder was quickly revealed and the Armagnac family took political power in opposition to John. By 1410, both sides were bidding for the help of English forces in a civil war. In 1418 Paris was taken by the Burgundians, who were unable to stop the massacre of Count of Armagnac and his followers by a Parisian crowd, with an estimated death toll between 1,000 and 5,000.

Throughout this period, England confronted repeated raids by pirates that damaged trade and the navy. There is some evidence that Henry IV used state-legalised piracy as a form of warfare in the English Channel. He used such privateering campaigns to pressure enemies without risking open war. The French responded in kind and French pirates, under Scottish protection, raided many English coastal towns. The domestic and dynastic difficulties faced by England and France in this period quieted the war for a decade. Henry IV died in 1413 and was replaced by his eldest son Henry V. The mental illness of Charles VI of France allowed his power to be exercised by royal princes whose rivalries caused deep divisions in France. In 1414 while Henry held court at Leicester, he received ambassadors from Burgundy. Henry accredited envoys to the French king to make clear his territorial claims in France; he also demanded the hand of Charles VI's youngest daughter Catherine of Valois. The French rejected his demands, leading Henry to prepare for war.

Resumption of the war under Henry V: 1415–1429

Burgundian alliance and the seizure of Paris

Battle of Agincourt (1415) 

In August 1415, Henry V sailed from England with a force of about 10,500 and laid siege to Harfleur. The city resisted for longer than expected, but finally surrendered on 22 September. Because of the unexpected delay, most of the campaign season was gone. Rather than march on Paris directly, Henry elected to make a raiding expedition across France toward English-occupied Calais. In a campaign reminiscent of Crécy, he found himself outmanoeuvred and low on supplies and had to fight a much larger French army at the Battle of Agincourt, north of the Somme. Despite the problems and having a smaller force, his victory was near-total; the French defeat was catastrophic, costing the lives of many of the Armagnac leaders. About 40% of the French nobility was killed. Henry was apparently concerned that the large number of prisoners taken were a security risk (there were more French prisoners than there were soldiers in the entire English army) and he ordered their deaths.

Treaty of Troyes (1420) 

Henry retook much of Normandy, including Caen in 1417, and Rouen on 19 January 1419, turning Normandy English for the first time in two centuries. A formal alliance was made with Burgundy, which had taken Paris in 1418 before the assassination of Duke John the Fearless in 1419. In 1420, Henry met with King Charles VI. They signed the Treaty of Troyes, by which Henry finally married Charles' daughter Catherine of Valois and Henry's heirs would inherit the throne of France. The Dauphin, Charles VII, was declared illegitimate. Henry formally entered Paris later that year and the agreement was ratified by the Estates-General.

Death of the Duke of Clarence (1421) 

On 22 March 1421 Henry V's progress in his French campaign experienced an unexpected reversal. Henry had left his brother and presumptive heir Thomas, Duke of Clarence in charge while he returned to England. Clarence engaged a Franco-Scottish force of 5000 men, led by Gilbert Motier de La Fayette and John Stewart, Earl of Buchan at the Battle of Baugé. Clarence, against the advice of his lieutenants, before his army had been fully assembled, attacked with a force of no more than 1500 men-at-arms. Then, during the course of the battle, he led a charge of a few hundred men into the main body of the Franco-Scottish army, who quickly enveloped the English. In the ensuing mêlée, the Scot, John Carmichael of Douglasdale, broke his lance unhorsing the Duke of Clarence. Once on the ground, the duke was slain by Alexander Buchanan. The body of the Duke of Clarence was recovered from the field by Thomas Montacute, 4th Earl of Salisbury, who conducted the English retreat.

English success 

Henry V returned to France and went to Paris, then visiting Chartres and Gâtinais before returning to Paris. From there, he decided to attack the Dauphin-held town of Meaux. It turned out to be more difficult to overcome than first thought. The siege began about 6 October 1421, and the town held for seven months before finally falling on 11 May 1422.

At the end of May, Henry was joined by his queen and together with the French court, they went to rest at Senlis. While there, it became apparent that he was ill (possibly dysentery), and when he set out to the Upper Loire, he diverted to the royal castle at Vincennes, near Paris, where he died on 31 August. The elderly and insane Charles VI of France died two months later on 21 October. Henry left an only child, his nine-month-old son, Henry, later to become Henry VI.

On his deathbed, as Henry VI was only an infant, Henry V had given the Duke of Bedford responsibility for English France. The war in France continued under Bedford's generalship and several battles were won. The English won an emphatic victory at the Battle of Verneuil (17 August 1424). At the Battle of Baugé, the Duke of Clarence had rushed into battle without the support of his archers. At Verneuil, the archers fought to devastating effect against the Franco-Scottish army. The effect of the battle was to virtually destroy the Dauphin's field army and to eliminate the Scots as a significant military force for the rest of the war.

French victory: 1429–1453

Joan of Arc and French revival 

The appearance of Joan of Arc at the siege of Orléans sparked a revival of French spirit, and the tide began to turn against the English. The English laid siege to Orléans in 1428, but their force was insufficient to fully invest the city. In 1429 Joan persuaded the Dauphin to send her to the siege, saying she had received visions from God telling her to drive out the English. She raised the morale of the troops, and they attacked the English redoubts, forcing the English to lift the siege. Inspired by Joan, the French took several English strongholds on the Loire.

The English retreated from the Loire Valley, pursued by a French army. Near the village of Patay, French cavalry broke through a unit of English longbowmen that had been sent to block the road, then swept through the retreating English army. The English lost 2,200 men, and the commander, John Talbot, 1st Earl of Shrewsbury, was taken prisoner. This victory opened the way for the Dauphin to march to Reims for his coronation as Charles VII, on 16 July 1429.

After the coronation, Charles VII's army fared less well. An attempted French siege of Paris was defeated on 8 September 1429, and Charles VII withdrew to the Loire Valley.

Henry's coronations and the desertion of Burgundy 
Henry VI was crowned king of England at Westminster Abbey on 5 November 1429 and king of France at Notre-Dame, in Paris, on 16 December 1431.

Joan of Arc was captured by the Burgundians at the siege of Compiègne on 23 May 1430. The Burgundians then transferred her to the English, who organised a trial headed by Pierre Cauchon, Bishop of Beauvais and a collaborator with the English government who served as a member of the English Council at Rouen. Joan was convicted and burned at the stake on 30 May 1431 (she was rehabilitated 25 years later by Pope Callixtus III).

After the death of Joan of Arc, the fortunes of war turned dramatically against the English. Most of Henry's royal advisers were against making peace. Among the factions, the Duke of Bedford wanted to defend Normandy, the Duke of Gloucester was committed to just Calais, whereas Cardinal Beaufort was inclined to peace. Negotiations stalled. It seems that at the congress of Arras, in the summer of 1435, where the duke of Beaufort was mediator, the English were unrealistic in their demands. A few days after the congress ended in September, Philip the Good, duke of Burgundy, deserted to Charles VII, signing the Treaty of Arras that returned Paris to the King of France. This was a major blow to English sovereignty in France. The Duke of Bedford died on 14 September 1435 and was later replaced by Richard Plantagenet, 3rd Duke of York.

French resurgence 

The allegiance of Burgundy remained fickle, but the Burgundian focus on expanding their domains in the Low Countries left them little energy to intervene in the rest of France. The long truces that marked the war gave Charles time to centralise the French state and reorganise his army and government, replacing his feudal levies with a more modern professional army that could put its superior numbers to good use. A castle that once could only be captured after a prolonged siege would now fall after a few days from cannon bombardment. The French artillery developed a reputation as the best in the world.

By 1449, the French had retaken Rouen. In 1450 the Count of Clermont and Arthur de Richemont, Earl of Richmond, of the Montfort family (the future Arthur III, Duke of Brittany), caught an English army attempting to relieve Caen and defeated it at the Battle of Formigny in 1450. Richemont's force attacked the English army from the flank and rear just as they were on the verge of beating Clermont's army.

French conquest of Gascony 

After Charles VII's successful Normandy campaign in 1450, he concentrated his efforts on Gascony, the last province held by the English. Bordeaux, Gascony's capital, was besieged and surrendered to the French on 30 June 1451. Largely due to the English sympathies of the Gascon people, this was reversed when John Talbot and his army retook the city on 23 October 1452. However, the English were decisively defeated at the Battle of Castillon on 17 July 1453. Talbot had been persuaded to engage the French army at Castillon near Bordeaux. During the battle the French appeared to retreat towards their camp. The French camp at Castillon had been laid out by Charles VII's ordinance officer Jean Bureau and this was instrumental in the French success as when the French cannon opened fire, from their positions in the camp, the English took severe casualties losing both Talbot and his son.

End of the war 

Although the Battle of Castillon is considered the last battle of the Hundred Years' War, England and France remained formally at war for another 20 years, but the English were in no position to carry on the war as they faced unrest at home. Bordeaux fell to the French on 19 October and there were no more hostilities afterwards. Following defeat in the Hundred Years' War, English landowners complained vociferously about the financial losses resulting from the loss of their continental holdings; this is often considered a major cause of the Wars of the Roses that started in 1455.

The Hundred Years' War almost resumed in 1474, when the duke Charles of Burgundy, counting on English support, took up arms against Louis XI. Louis managed to isolate the Burgundians by buying Edward IV of England off with a large cash sum and an annual pension, in the Treaty of Picquigny (1475). The treaty formally ended the Hundred Years' War with Edward renouncing his claim to the throne of France. However, future Kings of England (and later of Great Britain) continued to claim the title until 1803, when they were dropped in deference to the exiled Count of Provence, titular King Louis XVIII, who was living in England after the French Revolution.

Some historians use the term "The Second Hundred Years' War" as a periodisation to describe the series of military conflicts between Great Britain and France that occurred from about 1689 (or some say 1714) to 1815. Likewise, some historians refer to the Capetian–Plantagenet rivalry, series of conflicts and disputes that covered a period of 100 years (1159–1259) as "The First Hundred Years War".

Significance

Historical significance 

The French victory marked the end of a long period of instability that had been seeded with the Norman Conquest (1066), when William the Conqueror added "King of England" to his titles, becoming both the vassal to (as Duke of Normandy) and the equal of (as king of England) the king of France.

When the war ended, England was bereft of its Continental possessions, leaving it with only Calais on the continent (until 1558). The war destroyed the English dream of a joint monarchy and led to the rejection in England of all things French, although the French language in England, which had served as the language of the ruling classes and commerce there from the time of the Norman conquest, left many vestiges in English vocabulary. English became the official language in 1362 and French was no longer used for teaching from 1385.

National feeling that emerged from the war unified both France and England further. Despite the devastation on its soil, the Hundred Years' War accelerated the process of transforming France from a feudal monarchy to a centralised state. In England the political and financial troubles which emerged from the defeat were a major cause of the War of the Roses (1455–1487).

Historian Ben Lowe argued in 1997 that opposition to the war helped to shape England's early modern political culture. Although anti-war and pro-peace spokesmen generally failed to influence outcomes at the time, they had a long-term impact. England showed decreasing enthusiasm for conflict deemed not in the national interest, yielding only losses in return for high economic burdens. In comparing this English cost-benefit analysis with French attitudes, given that both countries suffered from weak leaders and undisciplined soldiers, Lowe noted that the French understood that warfare was necessary to expel the foreigners occupying their homeland. Furthermore, French kings found alternative ways to finance the war – sales taxes, debasing the coinage – and were less dependent than the English on tax levies passed by national legislatures. English anti-war critics thus had more to work with than the French.

A 2021 theory about the early formation of state capacity is that interstate war was responsible for initiating a strong move toward states implementing tax systems with higher state capabilities. For example, see France in the Hundred Years' War, when the English occupation threatened the independent French Kingdom. The king and his ruling elite demanded consistent and permanent taxation, which would allow a permanent standing army to be financed. The French nobility, which had always opposed such an extension of state capacity, agreed in this exceptional situation. Hence, the inter-state war with England increased French state capability.

Bubonic plague and warfare reduced population numbers throughout Europe during this period. France lost half its population during the Hundred Years' War, with Normandy reduced by three-quarters and Paris by two-thirds. During the same period, England's population fell by 20 to 33 percent.

Military significance 

The first regular standing army in Western Europe since Roman times was organised in France in 1445, partly as a solution to marauding free companies. The mercenary companies were given a choice of either joining the Royal army as compagnies d'ordonnance on a permanent basis, or being hunted down and destroyed if they refused. France gained a total standing army of around 6,000 men, which was sent out to gradually eliminate the remaining mercenaries who insisted on operating on their own. The new standing army had a more disciplined and professional approach to warfare than its predecessors.

The Hundred Years' War was a time of rapid military evolution. Weapons, tactics, army structure and the social meaning of war all changed, partly in response to the war's costs, partly through advancement in technology and partly through lessons that warfare taught. The feudal system slowly disintegrated as well as the concept of chivalry.

By the war's end, although the heavy cavalry was still considered the most powerful unit in an army, the heavily armoured horse had to deal with several tactics developed to deny or mitigate its effective use on a battlefield. The English began using lightly armoured mounted troops, known as hobelars. Hobelars' tactics had been developed against the Scots, in the Anglo-Scottish wars of the 14th century. Hobelars rode smaller unarmoured horses, enabling them to move through difficult or boggy terrain where heavier cavalry would struggle. Rather than fight while seated on the horse, they would dismount to engage the enemy. The closing battle of the war, the Battle of Castillon, was the first major battle won through the extensive use of field artillery.

Timeline

Battles

Prominent figures

France

England

Burgundy

See also 

 Anglo-French relations
 British military history
 Capetian–Plantagenet rivalry – this conflict is also called by some historians, the "First Hundred Years War".
 French military history
 Influence of French on English
 List of battles involving France in the Middle Ages
 Medieval demography
 Second Hundred Years' War – this is the name given by some historians to the near-continuous series of conflicts between Britain and France from 1688 to 1815, beginning with the Glorious Revolution and ending with the Battle of Waterloo.
 Timeline of the Hundred Years' War

Notes

References

Sources

Further reading 

 
 Corrigan, Gordon (2014), A Great and Glorious Adventure: A Military History of the Hundred Years War, Atlantic Books, 
 Cuttino, G. P., "The Causes of the Hundred Years War", Speculum 31#3 (1956), pp. 463–477 online
 
 
 Green, David (2014), The Hundred Years War: A People's History. New Haven and London: Yale. 
 
 Postan, M. M. "Some Social Consequences of the Hundred Years' War", Economic History Review 12#1/2, 1942, pp. 1–12. online

External links 

 The Hundred Years War and the History of Navarre
 
 The Hundred Years' War (1336–1565) by Dr. Lynn H. Nelson, University of Kansas Emeritus
 The Hundred Years' War information and game
 Jean Froissart, "On The Hundred Years War (1337–1453)" from the Internet Medieval Sourcebook
 Online database of Soldiers serving in the Hundred Years War. University of Southampton and University of Reading.
 

 
14th century in France
15th century in France
Anglo-French wars
Wars of the Middle Ages
Wars involving Scotland
Wars involving Luxembourg
Wars involving Portugal
Wars involving the Holy Roman Empire
Global conflicts
Wars of succession involving the states and peoples of Europe